Gilbert Thomas "Birtie" Maher (December 16, 1892December 3, 1980) was an American player of American football.

Maher was born in 1892 to Irish immigrant parents in the Corktown neighborhood of Detroit. He played college football for the University of Detroit as its star halfback in 1913, and for the Detroit Heralds starting in 1911.  When the Heralds joined the new National Football League (NFL) in 1920, Maher was a member of Detroit's first NFL team.

References

1892 births
1980 deaths
American football ends
American football halfbacks
Detroit Heralds players
Detroit Titans football players
Players of American football from Michigan